Governor Williams may refer to:

Abraham J. Williams (1781–1839), 3rd Governor of Missouri
Arnold Williams (American politician) (1898–1970), 21st Governor of Idaho
Benjamin Williams (1751–1814), 11th Governor of North Carolina
Charles K. Williams (1782–1853), 20th Governor of Vermont
David Rogerson Williams (1776–1830), 45th Governor of South Carolina
David Williams (Royal Navy officer) (1921–2012), Governor of Gibraltar from 1982 to 1985
Fenwick Williams (1800–1883), Governor of Gibraltar from 1870 to 1876
G. Mennen Williams (1911–1988), 41st Governor of Michigan
Jack Williams (American politician) (1909–1998), 13th Governor of Arizona
James D. Williams (1808–1880), 17th Governor of Indiana
Jared W. Williams (1796–1864), 21st Governor of New Hampshire
John Bell Williams (1918–1983), 55th Governor of Mississippi
Joseph H. Williams (1814–1896), 27th Governor of Maine
Martin Williams (diplomat) (born 1941), Governor of the Pitcairn Islands from 1998 to 2001
Philip Williams (United States Navy) (1869–1942), military governor of the United States Virgin Islands
Ralph Champneys Williams (1848–1927), Governor of the Windward Islands from 1906 to 1909 and Dominion Governor of Newfoundland from 1909 to 1913
Ransome Judson Williams (1892–1970), 102nd Governor of South Carolina
Robert Williams (Mississippi politician) (1773–1836), Governor of the Mississippi Territory from 1805 to 1809
Robert L. Williams (1868–1948), 3rd Governor of Oklahoma
Roger Williams (1603–1683), "Governor for Life" of Aquidneck Island and Conanicut Island